Temperature-sensitive mutants are variants of genes that allow normal function of the organism at low temperatures, but altered function at higher temperatures.  Cold sensitive mutants are variants of genes that allow normal function of the organism at higher temperatures, but altered function at low temperatures.

Mechanism
Most temperature-sensitive mutations affect proteins, and cause loss of protein function at the non-permissive temperature. The permissive temperature is one at which the protein typically can fold properly, or remain properly folded. At higher temperatures, the protein is unstable and ceases to function properly. These mutations are usually recessive in diploid organisms. Temperature sensitive mutants arrange a reversible mechanism and are able to reduce particular gene products at varying stages of growth and are easily done by changing the temperature of growth.

Permissive temperature
The permissive temperature is the temperature at which a temperature-sensitive mutant gene product takes on a normal, functional phenotype.
When a temperature-sensitive mutant is grown in a permissive condition, the mutated gene product behaves normally (meaning that the phenotype is not observed), even if there is a mutant allele present. This results in the survival of the cell or organism, as if it were a wild type strain. In contrast, the nonpermissive temperature or restrictive temperature is the temperature at which the mutant phenotype is observed.

Temperature sensitive mutations are usually missense mutations, which then will harbor the function of a specified necessary gene at the standard, permissive, low temperature. It will alternatively lack the function at a rather high, non-permissive, temperature and display a hypomorphic (partial loss of gene function) and a middle, semi-permissive, temperature.

Use in research 
Temperature-sensitive mutants are useful in biological research. They allow the study of essential processes required for the survival of the cell or organism.  Mutations to essential genes are generally lethal and hence temperature-sensitive mutants enable researchers to induce the phenotype at the restrictive temperatures and study the effects. The temperature-sensitive phenotype could be expressed during a specific developmental stage to study the effects.

Examples 
In the late 1970s, the budding yeast secretory pathway, essential for viability of the cell and for growth of new buds, was dissected using temperature-sensitive mutants, resulting in the identification of twenty-three essential genes.

In the 1970s, several temperature-sensitive mutant genes were identified in the fruit fly, such as shibirets, which led to the first genetic dissection of synaptic function.  In the 1990s, the heat shock promoter hsp70 was used in temperature-modulated gene expression in the fruit fly.

Bacteriophage

An infection of an E. coli host cell by a bacteriophage (phage) T4 temperature sensitive (ts) conditionally lethal mutant at a high restrictive temperature generally leads to no phage growth.  However, a co-infection under restrictive conditions with two ts mutants defective in different genes generally leads to robust growth because of intergenic complementation.  The discovery of ts mutants of phage T4, and the employment of such mutants in complementation tests contributed to the identification of many of the genes in this organism.  Because multiple copies of a polypeptide specified by a gene often form multimers, mixed infections with two different ts mutants defective in the same gene often leads to mixed multimers and partial restoration of function, a phenomenon referred to as intragenic complementation.  Intragenic complementation of ts mutants defective in the same gene can provide information on the structural organization of the multimer.

Growth of phage ts mutants under partially restrictive conditions has been used to identify the functions of genes.  Thus genes employed in the repair of DNA damages were identified, as well as genes affecting genetic recombination.  For example, growing a ts DNA repair mutant at an intermediate temperature will allow some progeny phage to be produced.  However, if that ts mutant is irradiated with UV light, its survival will be more strongly reduced compared the reduction of survival of irradiated wild-type phage T4.

Conditional lethal mutants able to grow at high temperatures, but unable to grow at low temperatures, were also isolated in phage T4.  These cold sensitive mutants defined a discrete set of genes, some of which had been previously identified by other types of conditional lethal mutants.

References

Temperature
Cell biology
Biology terminology